Attar Club de Kidal, better known as simply Attar Club, is a Malian basketball club from Kidal. The team plays in the Ligue 1, the highest national basketball league. In 2020 and 2021, Attar was the runner-up behind AS Police.

Honours
Ligue 1
Runners-up (2): 2019–20, 2020–21
Malian Cup
Champions (1): 2019
Runners-up (1): 2020

References

Basketball teams in Mali